Space Shot or space shot may refer to:
 Space shot (ride), a variation of the drop tower amusement ride
 Space launch, launches into space
 Space Shot (G.I. Joe), a fictional character in the G.I. Joe universe
 Spaceshot (Transformers), a Transformers character
 Shooter: Space Shot, a video game
 Space Shots (trading cards), series of space-themed trading cards